Sinji galeb is a 1953 Croatian film directed by Branko Bauer. It is based on the Cyan-Blue Seagull Brotherhood, a novel written by the Slovene writer Tone Seliškar.

Plot summary 
A boy named Ive (Rizvanbegović) sails out to sea with his friends in order to make money to pay off his father's debt. Ive and his friends name their boat Sinji galeb ("Cyan-Blue Seagull"). While sailing, they run into maritime criminals led by Lorenco (Nalis).

References

External links 
 

1953 films
1950s Croatian-language films
Yugoslav children's films
Jadran Film films
Films based on Slovenian novels
Croatian children's films
Croatian black-and-white films
Yugoslav black-and-white films